Kaduy is an urban locality (a work settlement) and the administrative center of Kaduysky District of Vologda Oblast, Russia, located on the Voron River (a right tributary of the Suda) at the confluence with the Sivets River,  west of the city of Cherepovets. Municipally, it is incorporated as Kaduyskoye Urban Settlement, one of the two urban settlements in the district. Population:

History
The first mention of the village "Kaduy" was recorded in 1626.

Kaduy was founded in 1904 as the settlement around a station on the railway connecting Vologda and Saint Petersburg The actual traffic was open in 1906. At the time, Kaduy was located in Cherepovetsky Uyezd of Novgorod Governorate.

In June 1918, five uyezds of Novgorod Governorate, including Cherepovetsky Uyezds, were split off to form Cherepovets Governorate, with the administrative center in Cherepovets. On August 1, 1927 Cherepovets Governorate was abolished, and its area became Cherepovets Okrug of Leningrad Oblast. Simultaneously, uyezds were abolished, and Kaduysky District with the center in Kaduy was established. On September 23, 1937 Kaduysky District was transferred to newly established Vologda Oblast.

In 1947, Kaduy got the status of an urban-type settlement.

Economy

Industry
There are enterprises of timber industry and food industry in Kaduy.

Transportation
The railroad connecting Vologda to Saint Petersburg via Cherepovets passes through Kaduy. There is a railway station in the settlement, which was, in fact, founded as a settlement around the railway station.

Kaduy is connect by road with Cherepovets, and another road runs north to the village of Velikoye and further to the village of Vizma in Belozersky District. There is local bus traffic.

Culture and recreation
The Kaduysky District Museum is located in Kaduy. The museum opened in 2000, but previously functioned since the 1970s as a school museum, founded by Alexander Yukov. The museum currently is named after him.

References

Notes

Sources

Urban-type settlements in Vologda Oblast
Populated places in Kaduysky District